The 1973 IX FIBA International Christmas Tournament "Trofeo Raimundo Saporta" was the 9th edition of the FIBA International Christmas Tournament. It took place at Sports City of Real Madrid Pavilion, Madrid, Spain, on 24, 25 and 26 December 1973 with the participations of Real Madrid (champions of the 1972–73 Liga Española de Baloncesto), Puerto Rico, Juventud Schweppes (semifinalists of the 1972–73 FIBA European Cup Winners' Cup) and Obras Sanitarias.

League stage

Day 1, December 24, 1973

|}

Day 2, December 25, 1973

|}

Day 3, December 26, 1973

|}

Final standings

References

1973–74 in European basketball
1973–74 in Spanish basketball